Salsa de calçots (Calçots' sauce) is a Catalan sauce originating in Valls, province of Tarragona in the region of Catalonia, which is served almost exclusively with calçots at the calçotades, a traditional local barbecue.

It is similar to romesco sauce with the difference that it is thickened with toast rubbed with fresh garlic, moistened with a little vinegar and pulverized.

See also
 List of sauces

References

Catalan cuisine
Sauces